Eric Joseph Simeon (1918–2007), was an Indian school educationalist. He was the headmaster of some of the distinguished schools of India from 1960s to the mid-1980s. He served as the headmaster of La Martiniere Calcutta, The Doon School and Cathedral and John Connon School.

Career
In 1949, then Capt. Eric Simeon — a Corps of Signals officer — was posted at the Prince of Wales Royal Indian Military College, Dehradun.

Later, in July 1961 when stationed in Delhi — he was summoned by V. K. Krishna Menon, then Defence Minister of India, to head the first Sainik School of India. It was the beginning of his educational career when he became the Founder Principal of Sainik School, Kunjpura. He served there for seven years till his retirement from the Indian Army in 1967.

From 1967 till 1970, he was the headmaster of La Martiniere School for Boys, Calcutta. After his tenure at La Martiniere he joined The Doon School as its fourth headmaster. He was the first Indian headmaster at the Doon School and became one of the longest serving headmasters in Doon's history with a tenure spanning almost a decade. After his retirement from Doon, his last project was the headmastership of Cathedral and John Connon School in Mumbai.

On 15 May 2007 he died of lung cancer.

See also
 Prince of Wales Royal Indian Military College
 The Doon School
 Headmasters of The Doon School

References

Further reading
 Chhota Hazri Days: A Dosco's Yatra by Sanjiv Bathla, Rupa & Co., 2010 .
 The Corporeal Image by David McDougall, Princeton University Press, 2006, .
 Doon, The Story of a School, IPSS (1985) edited by Sumer Singh, published by the Indian Public Schools Society 1985.
 Constructing Post-Colonial India: National Character and the Doon School by Sanjay Srivastva, published by Routledge 1998 .
 The Doon School – Sixty Years On, edited by Pushpinder Singh Chopra, published by the Doon School Old Boys' Society in October 1996

1918 births
2007 deaths
Headmasters of The Doon School
Scholars from Allahabad